The 1930 Primera División was the 15th season of top-flight Peruvian football. A total of 12 teams competed in this league, with Atlético Chalaco winning its first league title.

Changes from 1929

Structural changes 
The number of teams was reduced from 13 to 12. The 12 teams were divided into 3 groups of 4 and the winner of each group advanced to the championship group. The last-placed team of each group would play in a relegation group with the last-placed team being relegated.

Promotion and relegation 
Jorge Chávez and Alianza Chorrillos placed 11th and 12th place respectively in the 1929 season and were relegated. Lawn Tennis was promoted in their place.

First stage

Group 1

Group 2

Group 3

Relegation group

Championship group

External links 
 Peru 1930 season at RSSSF
 Peruvian Football League News 

Peru
1930
1930 in Peruvian football